Emilio Eduardo Massera (19 October 1925 – 8 November 2010) was an Argentine Naval military officer, and a leading participant in the Argentine coup d'état of 1976. In 1981, he was found to be a member of P2 (also known as Propaganda Due), a clandestine Masonic lodge involved in Italy's strategy of tension. Many considered Massera to have masterminded the junta's Dirty War against political opponents, which resulted in over 30,000 deaths and disappeances.

Biography
Coming from a Catholic family, Emilio Massera was born in Paraná, Entre Ríos, to Paula Padula and Emilio Massera, grandson of immigrants from Switzerland. Massera entered Argentina's Naval Military School in 1942, obtaining his commission as a midshipman in 1946. After the Revolución Libertadora in 1955, Massera entered the Naval Information Service. During his career he occupied different positions within the Navy, including command of the sail training ship ARA Libertad and command of the Sea Fleet in 1973. In 1974 Massera was promoted to the rank of full Admiral and became the Commander-in-Chief of the Argentine Navy, after the government sent a number of senior admirals into forced retirement.

Between 1976 and 1978 Admiral Massera was part, together with Jorge Rafael Videla and Orlando Ramón Agosti, of the military junta that deposed President Isabel Perón and ruled Argentina de facto during the National Reorganization Process. On September 1978 Massera stepped down from both the office of Commander-in-Chief of the Navy and from his seat in the Military Junta. In 1981 he travelled to Bucharest, Romania.

After the end of the dictatorship in 1983, he was tried for human rights violations and sentenced to life imprisonment and the loss of his military grade.  However, on 29 December 1990 he was pardoned by then-President Carlos Menem. Massera was free until 1998, when he was imprisoned again pending an investigation of several instances of kidnapping and suppression of identity of minors during his term, as well as orders of torture, execution, confinement in illegal detention centers and drowning of prisoners.

He also explained the delivery of diplomatic passports to Licio Gelli, head of Propaganda Due, by stating that Gelli had "supported [us] in the struggle against subversion and in the management of the image of Argentina abroad".

In 2004 he suffered a cerebrovascular accident caused by a burst aneurysm, and he was admitted in the Military Hospital of Buenos Aires. As a result of the stroke, Eduardo Massera was declared legally irresponsible because of insanity on 17 March 2005, and the cases against him were suspended.

Massera died on 8 November 2010 of an hemorrhagic stroke in the Hospital Naval of Buenos Aires. The funeral was kept in secrecy to avoid escraches, and was attended by only 10 people, without any representation of the government or the armed forces.

References

Argentine Navy admirals
Operatives of the Dirty War
People from Paraná, Entre Ríos
1925 births
2010 deaths
Argentine people of Swiss-Italian descent
Argentine prisoners and detainees
Prisoners and detainees of Argentina
Argentine people convicted of crimes against humanity
Recipients of Argentine presidential pardons
Argentine anti-communists
Argentine Freemasons
Politicide perpetrators